Tapirocarpus is a genus of flowering plants belonging to the family Burseraceae.

Its native range is Guyana.

Species:

Tapirocarpus talisia

References

Burseraceae
Burseraceae genera